2020 Polish protests may refer to:

August 2020 LGBT protests in Poland
2020–2021 women's strike protests in Poland

See also 
Polish rule-of-law crisis